The 2017 Presidential Tour of Turkey was a road cycling stage race that took place in Turkey between 10 and 15 October 2017. It was the 53rd edition of the Presidential Tour of Turkey and was part of the 2017 UCI World Tour. It was the first time that the race was included in the UCI World Tour calendar. Originally, the race was scheduled to take place between 18–23 April, but was postponed in February. At the end of March, the race was confirmed to be held over 10–15 October.

The race was won by Diego Ulissi of Italy.

Final standings

General classification

References

External links
 

Presidential Tour of Turkey
Presidential Tour of Turkey
Presidential Cycling Tour of Turkey by year
Presidential Tour of Turkey